The China national cricket team is the team that represents China in international cricket. The team was organised by the Chinese Cricket Association, which became an affiliate member of the International Cricket Council (ICC) in 2004 and an associate member in 2017. China did not make its debut in international cricket until the 2009 ACC Trophy Challenge,  although the Shanghai Cricket Club had previously acted as a de facto national side, from 1866 playing interport matches against international teams. China has since participated in several other Asian Cricket Council (ACC) tournaments, as well as at the 2010 and 2014 Asian Games cricket events.  Hong Kong (a Special Administrative Region of China) and Taiwan (claimed as China's 23rd province) both field separate teams in international cricket. 

In April 2018, the ICC decided to grant full Twenty20 International (T20I) status to all its members. Therefore, all Twenty20 matches played between China and other ICC members after 1 January 2019 will be a full T20I.

History
Between 1858 and 1948, the Shanghai Cricket Club, the largest club in the country, playing games against many touring sides, but it was not recognised as an official national team.

Since September 2005, the Chinese Cricket Association has conducted eight coaching/umpiring training courses with assistance from the Asian Cricket Council. The sport is now played in nine cities in China, namely Beijing, Shanghai, Shenyang, Dalian, Guangzhou, Shenzhen, Chongqing, Tianjin and Jinan. More than 150 schools have been involved.

China took part in the 2009 ACC Trophy Challenge, their first appearance in a representative tournament. The Chinese lost all of their group matches, including against Iran and the Maldives where they lost by 307 and 315 runs respectively. In the seventh-place playoff, China recorded their first-ever international win when they beat Myanmar by 118 runs.

China took part in the 2014 ACC Twenty20 Cup in the United Arab Emirates. The team lost their first game against Afghanistan by 9 wickets after being bowled out for just 37. China lost all five of their group games by wide margins, including a record low total and record margin of defeat in a representative Twenty20 match when they lost to the United Arab Emirates by 209 runs after conceding 236 runs during the UAE's innings and then in reply were bowled out for 27 runs, with 15 of those runs coming in extras. They lost to Bahrain in the eleventh place playoff, thus finishing the tournament in twelfth and last place.

China participated in the 2010 Asian Games where, as host, it played against Afghanistan, Bangladesh, Oman, Pakistan, Sri Lanka and the United Arab Emirates. It will again participate as a host team in the 2022 Asian Games.

Grounds

Tournament history

ACC Eastern Region T20
 2018: 4th place
 2020: Did not participate

ACC Trophy Challenge
2009: 7th place
2010: 6th place
2012: 6th place

ACC Twenty20 Cup

2009: 12th place
2011: Did Not Qualify
2013: Did Not Qualify
2015: Did Not Qualify

Asian Games
2010: Quarter Finals
2014: Group Stage

East Asia Cup
2015: 4th
2016: 4th place
2018: 3rd place

Records
For a list of selected international matches played by China, see Cricket Archive.

References

Cricket in China
National cricket teams
Cricket
China in international cricket